José Concepción Herrera Ontiveros (April 8, 1942 – October 16, 2009) was a Venezuelan professional baseball player who appeared as an outfielder and second baseman in Major League Baseball for the Houston Astros (–) and Montreal Expos (–).

Career
Born in San Lorenzo in Zulia, Herrera was signed by the Houston Colt .45s in 1964 as an amateur free agent and made his debut with the team on June 3, 1967, two years after it became the Astros. He was recalled after batting over .280 during his first three minor league seasons. It was an unusual debut: Houston third baseman Bob Aspromonte, facing future Baseball Hall of Famer Jim Bunning of the Philadelphia Phillies in the fifth inning, protested a strike two call and was ejected from the game by umpire Frank Secory; Herrera, called upon to pinch hit with a two-strike count already on him, struck out—with the "K" charged to Aspromonte. Herrera later made four more pinch-hitting appearances that June, collecting one single in four official at bats and one run batted in. In 1968, Herrera batted over .300 in Triple-A and was rewarded with a more extended call-up to Houston, appearing in 27 games, and starting in 16 games in the outfield and seven at second base. He hit .240 with five extra-base hits, and was not protected in the 1968 National League expansion draft. The Expos selected him with the 29th overall pick.

The 1969 season would see Herrera's most extended MLB service. After hitting .301 in Triple-A, he appeared in 47 games for Montreal from June 17 through the end of the season, including 31 starts as an outfielder. He got off the mark quickly, batting over .350 into mid-August, and was still hitting .323 on September 1 with 11 multi-hit games, and his first two big-league home runs, struck July 24 and 26 against the Atlanta Braves at Fulton County Stadium. But he leveled off in September to finish at .286. Herrera had only one at bat on Opening Day 1970 at Crosley Field, Cincinnati, as a pinch hitter and struck out in his final MLB appearance.

He played six more years in the upper minors, including four in the Mexican League, before leaving the game in 1975.

In his MLB career of parts of four seasons, Herrera posted a .264 batting average with two home runs, 20 RBI, 16 runs, 61 hits, and ten doubles in 80 games played. He died in Lagunillas Municipality, Zulia, in his native country in 2009 at age 67.

See also
 List of Major League Baseball players from Venezuela

References

External links
, or Retrosheet
Mexican League statistics
Venezuelan Professional Baseball League statistics

1942 births
2009 deaths
Amarillo Sonics players
Buffalo Bisons (minor league) players
Cardenales de Lara players
Diablos Rojos del México players
Durham Bulls players
Evansville Triplets players
Houston Astros players
Jacksonville Suns players
Leones de Yucatán players
Llaneros de Portuguesa players
Major League Baseball outfielders
Major League Baseball players from Venezuela
Mexican League baseball players
Mineros de Coahuila players
Montreal Expos players
Oklahoma City 89ers players
People from Anzoátegui
Portland Beavers players
Statesville Colts players
Tiburones de La Guaira players
Toledo Mud Hens players
Vancouver Mounties players
Venezuelan expatriate baseball players in Canada
Venezuelan expatriate baseball players in Mexico
Venezuelan expatriate baseball players in the United States
Winnipeg Whips players